The Lawless Frontier is a 1934 American Monogram Western film directed by Robert N. Bradbury and starring John Wayne, Sheila Terry, George "Gabby" Hayes, and Earl Dwire. It was the tenth of the Lone Star westerns. The picture was made on a budget of $11,000, shot in less than a week at Red Rock Canyon north of Los Angeles, and released by Monogram on Nov. 22, 1934. The film remains an unusual showcase for Earl Dwire in the lead villain's role.

Cast
 John Wayne as John Tobin
 Sheila Terry as Ruby
 Jack Rockwell as Sheriff Luke Williams
 George "Gabby" Hayes as Dusty (credited as George Hayes)
 Earl Dwire as Pandro Zanti, alias Don Yorba
 Jay Wilsey as second Zanti henchman (credited as Buffalo Bill Jr.)
 Yakima Canutt as Joe, Zanti's henchman
 Gordon De Main as Deputy Miller (credited as Bud Wood)

See also
 John Wayne filmography
 List of American films of 1934

References

External links

 
 
 
 
 
 

1934 films
1930s English-language films
American black-and-white films
Films directed by Robert N. Bradbury
Monogram Pictures films
1934 Western (genre) films
American Western (genre) films
1930s American films